Wilson Township is a township in Ellsworth County, Kansas, United States.  As of the 2000 census, its population was 894.

Geography
According to the USGS, it contains two cemeteries: Wilson and Old Wilson.

The streams of Spring Creek and Wilson Creek run through this township.

References
 USGS Geographic Names Information System (GNIS)

External links
 City-Data.com

Townships in Ellsworth County, Kansas
Townships in Kansas